Sailing competitions at the 2022 South American Games in Asuncion, Paraguay were held between October 2 and 6, 2022 at the Playa San José, Encarnación

Schedule
The competition schedule is as follows:

Medal summary

Medal table

Medalists

Men's events

Women' events

Mixed events

Participation
Ten nations participated in sailing events of the 2022 South American Games.

References

Sailing
2022
South American American Games